This is a list of Paramount Global channels.

Americas

United States
 CBS Entertainment Group
 CBS (HD)
 Dabl Network (HD)
 Fave TV (HD)
 The CW (HD)

 MTV (HD)
 MTV2 (HD; formerly M2)
 MTV Classic (formerly VH1 Classic)
 MTV Tres (formerly MTV3)
 MTVU (formerly College Television Network)
 MTV Live (HD) (formerly MTV Music and Palladia)
 CMT (HD)
 CMT Music (formerly VH1 Country and CMT Pure Country)
 Comedy Central (HD)
 Logo TV (HD; formerly VH1 MegaHits)
 Nickelodeon (HD)
 Nick at Nite (HD)
 Nick Jr. (HD; formerly Noggin)
 NickMusic (formerly MTV Hits)
 Nicktoons (HD; formerly Nicktoons Network and Nicktoons TV)
 TeenNick (HD; formerly The N and Nick GAS)
 Paramount Network (HD; formerly The Nashville Network, The National Network (The New TNN), and Spike)
 TV Land (HD)
 VH1 (HD)
 BET (HD)
 BET Gospel
 BET Her (formerly BET on Jazz, BET Jazz, BETJ, and Centric)
 BET Hip-Hop
 BET Soul (formerly VH1 Soul)
 BET Jams (formerly MTV Jams)
 Showtime (HD)
 The Movie Channel (HD)
 Flix (HD)
 Pop (HD; formerly Prevue Guide/Channel, TV Guide Channel/Network and TVGN)
 Smithsonian Channel (HD)

Canada
All channels listed below are owned by Canadian broadcasters, with Paramount Global owning minor interests where indicated:

CMT (90% owned by Corus Entertainment; 10% owned by Paramount Global)
MTV (wholly owned by Bell Media)
MTV2 (wholly owned by Bell Media)
Nickelodeon (wholly owned by Corus)
Nick Jr. (Program block on Nickelodeon)

Note: Juicebox and Comedy Gold formerly existed as MTV2 Canada from 2001 to 2005 (later PunchMuch from 2005 to 2011) and TV Land Canada from 2001 to 2010, respectively.

Caribbean
Tr3s

Latin America

MTV
Nickelodeon
Comedy Central
Paramount Network
Telefe
Chilevisión
Nick Jr.
TeenNick
Telefe Internacional
MTV 00s
MTV Hits
MTV Live

Brazil
MTV (replaced MTV Brasil on October 1, 2013)
Nickelodeon Brazil 
Comedy Central 
Paramount Network 
Smithsonian Channel (owned by Grupo Bandeirantes; owned by Paramount)
Nick Jr. 
Telefe Internacional
MTV 00s
MTV Hits
MTV Live

Europe

Continent Wide
MTV Europe (countries not served by a local MTV channel only)
Nickelodeon Europe (countries not served by a local Nickelodeon channel only)
MTV Hits Europe
MTV Live
Club MTV Europe
MTV 80s
MTV 90s
MTV 00s

Adria (Albania, Bosnia & Herzegovina, Croatia, Kosovo, Montenegro, North Macedonia, Serbia & Slovenia)
MTV Europe (Replaced MTV Adria on January 1, 2018)
Nickelodeon Europe
Comedy Central Extra
MTV Hits Europe
MTV Live
Club MTV Europe
MTV 80s
MTV 90s
MTV 00s (Before VH1 Europe, replaced VH1 Adria on February 1, 2015)
Nick Jr.
Nicktoons Europe

Austria
MTV Germany (replaced MTV Austria on January 1, 2011)
MTV Austria
Nickelodeon Austria
Comedy Central Germany
VIVA Austria (2001–2003, again since 2006, closed in 2018)
MTV Hits
MTV Music 24
Club MTV Europe
MTV 80s
MTV 90s
MTV 00s
Nick Jr. Germany
Nicktoons Germany

Baltics (Estonia, Latvia & Lithuania)
MTV Europe (Replaced MTV Eesti, MTV Latvija and MTV Lietuva since 2009)
Nickelodeon
MTV Hits Europe
MTV Live
Club MTV Europe
MTV 80s
MTV 90s
MTV 00s
Nick Jr.
Nicktoons Europe

Benelux (The Netherlands & Belgium)
MTV Netherlands (SD and HD)
MTV Belgium
MTV Wallonia
Nickelodeon Netherlands (SD and HD)
Nickelodeon (Flanders)
Nickelodeon (Wallonia)
Comedy Central (Netherlands) (SD and HD)
Comedy Central Extra
MTV Hits Europe
MTV Live
MTV Music 24
Club MTV Europe
MTV 80s
MTV 90s
MTV 00s
Nick Jr. (Netherlands & Flanders)
Nickelodeon Junior
Nicktoons
NickMusic

Czech Republic
Paramount Network
MTV Global
MTV Czech MTV for Czech Republic and Slovakia (Closed)
MTV Hits Europe
MTV Live HD
Club MTV
MTV Rocks Europe (Closed)
MTV 80s
MTV 90s
MTV 00s
Nickelodeon Europe
Nicktoons Europe
Nick Jr. Europe
VH1 Europe (Closed)
VH1 Classic Europe (Closed)

Denmark
MTV Denmark
Nickelodeon Denmark
Nickelodeon (Continues to be available only through Satellite)
MTV Hits Europe
MTV Live
Club MTV Europe
MTV 90s
MTV 00s

Finland
MTV Finland
Nickelodeon
MTV Hits Europe
MTV Live
Club MTV Europe
MTV 80s
MTV 90s
MTV 00s
Nick Jr. Scandinavia
Nicktoons Scandinavia

France
MTV (HD)
Nickelodeon (HD)
Nickelodeon +1 (HD)
Comedy Central (France)
Paramount Channel (HD)
Paramount Channel Décalé (+2 timeshift channel, HD)
BET (HD)
Game One (HD)
Game One +1
J-One (HD)
MTV Hits (HD)
Club MTV Europe
MTV 80s
MTV 90s
MTV 00s
MY MTV (VOD)
Nickelodeon Junior (HD)
Nickelodeon 4Teen (HD) (Replaced by Nickelodeon Teen)

Germany
MTV Germany
Nick Germany (replaced MTV2 Pop on September 12, 2005, Nickelodeon Germany originally broadcast from 1995 to 1998)
Comedy Central Germany (replaced VIVA Plus on January 15, 2007)
VIVA Germany (closed on December 31, 2018)
MTV Hits Europe
MTV Live HD
MTV Music 24 (closed on June 1, 2021)
Club MTV Europe
MTV Brand New (closed on January 6, 2021; replaced with MTV Hits Germany)
MTV 80s
MTV 90s
MTV 00s
Nick Jr. Germany
Nicktoons Germany

Greece
MTV Greece (replaced by RISE)
MTV Europe (Greek)
MTV + (closed)
Nickelodeon Greece (SD and HD)
Nick Jr. (Program block on Nickelodeon)
MTV Hits Europe
MTV Live
MTV Music Greece (closed)
MTV Music International (Greek)
Club MTV Europe
MTV 80s
MTV 90s
MTV 00s

Hungary
MTV Hungary
Nickelodeon Hungary
Comedy Central Hungary
Paramount Channel Hungary
MTV Hits Europe
MTV Live HD
Club MTV Europe
MTV 80s
MTV 90s
MTV 00s
Nick Jr. Europe
Nicktoons Europe
TeenNick
Comedy Central Family Hungary

Ireland
MTV Ireland
MTV Music
MTV Hits
Comedy Central
Comedy Central +1
Comedy Central HD
Comedy Central Extra
Nickelodeon
Nickelodeon +1
Nickelodeon HD
Nick Jr.
Nick Jr. +1
Nick Jr. HD
Nick Jr. Too
Nicktoons

Italy 
MTV (HD)
Nickelodeon
MTV Brand New (closed)
Nickelodeon +1
Comedy Central
Comedy Central +1
Paramount Network (HD) (closed)
VH1 (HD)
Spike (HD) (closed)
Super!
MTV Music
Nick Jr.
Nick Jr. +1

Norway
MTV Norway
Nickelodeon Scandinavia
MTV Hits Europe
MTV Live
Club MTV Europe
MTV 80s
MTV 90s
MTV 00s

Poland
MTV Poland
MTV HD
Nickelodeon Poland
Comedy Central Poland
Polsat Comedy Central Extra (replaced Comedy Central Family Poland)
Paramount Channel Poland (replaced Viacom Blink!)
MTV Hits Europe
MTV Live
Club MTV Europe
MTV 80s
MTV 90s
MTV 00s
Nick Jr.
NickToons Poland HD (replaced Nickelodeon Europe HD)
NickMusic (replaced VIVA, MTV Music and MTV Music 24)

Portugal
MTV Portugal
Nickelodeon Portugal
MTV Hits Europe
MTV Live
Club MTV (European TV channel)
MTV 80s
MTV 90s
MTV 00s
MTV Base
Nick Jr. Portugal

Romania
MTV Romania (replaced with MTV Europe)
Nickelodeon Europe
Comedy Central Extra (replaced with Comedy Central
MTV Hits Europe
MTV Live
Club MTV Europe
VH1 Classic Europe (replaced with MTV 80s)
MTV Rocks (European TV channel)MTV Rocks Europe (replaced with MTV 90s)
MTV 00s
Nick Jr.
Nicktoons Europe
Paramount Channel (replaced with TeenNick)

Russia
(all operations suspended indefinitely. Channels continue broadcasting outside the territory of the Russian Federation)
MTV Russia (Russian, SD/HD) (Launched 25 September 1998. Restart October 1, 2013) 
Nickelodeon CIS (Russian, SD/HD)
Paramount Channel (Russian)
Spike (Russian, SD/HD) (Closed on 1 June 2021)
MTV Hits Europe (English) (Closed on 1 July 2021)
MTV Live (English) (Closed)
Club MTV Europe (English) (Closed on 1 July 2021)
MTV 80s (English) (Closed)
MTV 90s (English) (Closed)
MTV 00s (English) (Closed)
Nick Jr. (Russian) (Closed)
Nicktoons (Russian) (Closed)
Paramount Comedy (Russian)

Slovakia
MTV Global
MTV Czech MTV for Czech Republic and Slovakia (Closed)
MTV Hits Europe
MTV Live HD
Club MTV
MTV Rocks Europe (Closed)
MTV 80s
MTV 90s
MTV 00s
Nickelodeon Europe
Nicktoons Europe
Nick Jr. Europe
VH1 Europe (Closed)
VH1 Classic Europe (Closed)

Spain
MTV Spain (HD)
Nickelodeon Spain (HD)
Comedy Central Spain (HD)
Paramount Network Spain (Replaced Paramount Channel Spain)
MTV Hits Europe
MTV Live
Club MTV Europe
MTV 80s
MTV 90s
MTV 00s
Nick Jr. Spain (HD)

Sweden
MTV Sweden
Nickelodeon Sweden
Comedy Central Sweden
Paramount Channel Sweden
MTV Hits Europe
MTV Live
Club MTV Europe
MTV 80s
MTV 90s
MTV 00s
Nick Jr Scandinavia
Nicktoons Scandinavia

Switzerland
MTV Switzerland
Nickelodeon Switzerland
Comedy Central Germany
VIVA Switzerland (2000–2011, relaunch October 1, 2012, ended in 2018)
MTV Hits Europe
MTV Live
MTV Music 24
Club MTV Europe
MTV Brand New
MTV 80s
MTV 90s
MTV 00s
Nicktoons

Turkey
MTV Europe (Turkish)
Nickelodeon Turkey
MTV Hits Europe
MTV Live
Club MTV Europe
MTV 80s
MTV 90s
MTV 00s
Nick Jr. Turkey

Ukraine
MTV Ukraine (replaced by Zoom! on 31 May 2013)
MTV Europe (Ukrainian)
Nickelodeon CIS (Russian)
Nickelodeon Ukraine (Ukrainian language programming block; closed in October 2017)
MTV Hits Europe
MTV Live
Club MTV Europe
MTV 80s
MTV 90s
MTV 00s
Paramount Comedy

United Kingdom
MTV
MTV Shows (defunct)
MTV +1
MTV HD
MTV Music
MTV Music +1
MTV Base (defunct)
MTV Hits
MTV OMG (defunct)
Club MTV (replaced MTV Dance) (defunct)
MTV Rocks (defunct)
MTV Classic (defunct)
MTV Live
MTV 80s UK
MTV 90s UK
VH1 (defunct)
VIVA (defunct)
TMF (defunct)
Comedy Central
Comedy Central +1
Comedy Central HD
Comedy Central Extra
Comedy Central Extra +1
Nickelodeon
Nickelodeon +1
Nickelodeon HD
Nick Jr.
Nick Jr. +1
Nick Jr. HD
Nick Jr. Too
Nicktoons
BET
Channel 5
Channel 5 +1
Channel 5 HD
5Star
5Star +1
5 USA
5 USA +1
My5
5Spike (defunct)
Smithsonian Channel (defunct)

Middle East and North Africa

MTV (defunct)
Club MTV
MTV Live 
MTV 80s
MTV 90s
MTV 00s
VH1 (defunct)
Nickelodeon 
Nicktoons
Nick Jr. 
TeenNick
Comedy Central
Paramount Channel (defunct)

Israel 

 MTV Israel
 MTV Music 24
 MTV Hits Europe
 MTV Rocks Europe (defunct)
 VH1 Classic (defunct)
 Hot Comedy Central 
 Nickelodeon Israel
 Nick Jr. Israel
 TeenNick Israel
 Nickelodeon Arabia (Certain Cities only)

Asia Pacific

Australia
MTV Australia
Club MTV
MTV Hits
MTV Classic (Australia only)
MTV 80s (New Zealand only)
Nickelodeon Australia
Nick Jr.
NickMusic
Comedy Central
CMT
Spike (Australian TV channel)
Network 10 / 10HD
10 Bold
10 Peach
10 Shake

China
MTV China (Closed)
MTV Mandarin (Chinese)
HaHa Nick (Closed)

India

MTV India (HD)
Nickelodeon India (HD)
Nickelodeon Sonic
Nick Jr. India
TeenNick India (Closed)
VH1 (HD)
Colors TV
Colors Rishtey
Comedy Central (HD)
Rishtey Cineplex
MTV Beats
VH1 India
Colors Bangla  (HD)
Colors Gujarati
Colors Kannada (HD)
Colors Marathi (HD)
Colors Tamil (HD)
Colors Infinity (HD)
Colors Odia
Colors Super

Pakistan
Nickelodeon Pakistan (Owned by ARY Digital) 
MTV Pakistan (Closed)
VH1 Pakistan (Closed)

Indonesia
MTV Asia (Closed)
MTV 90s
MTV Indonesia (Re-Closed)
MTV Live HD
VH1 Indonesia (Closed)
Nickelodeon Asia
Nick Jr. Southeast Asia
Comedy Central Southeast Asia (Closed)

Japan
MTV Japan (High-definition channel)
MTV Hits Japan
MTV Mix Japan
Nickelodeon Japan

South Korea
Nickelodeon South Korea
SBS MTV (now SBS M)

New Zealand
MTV Australia and New Zealand
MTV 80s New Zealand
MTV Hits New Zealand
Comedy Central Australia & New Zealand
Nickelodeon Australia and New Zealand

Philippines
MTV (Philippines)
MTV Pinoy
MTVph
MTV Asia (Pilipino)
Nickelodeon Philippines
VH1 Philippines (Launched at July 12, 2012 at 12 midnight)
Nickelodeon Asia (Available in the Philippines from 1998 to 2011)

Taiwan
MTV Mandarin
Nickelodeon Asia (Taiwanese Mandarin)
Nick Jr. Southeast Asia (Taiwanese Mandarin)

Thailand
MTV Thailand (Re-Closed)
MTV Asia (English and Thai)
MTV Sports
VH1 Thailand
Nickelodeon Asia (Thai; Live Action Programming Subtitled)

Vietnam
MTV Vietnam (Closed)
Nick & You (Closed)

Sub-Saharan Africa

MTV Networks started operations in Africa in 1999 with the Nickelodeon block on M-net's K-TV then MTV Base in 2005. In 2008, Nickelodeon became a 24-hour channel. Since then the Network as expanded. Most of its channels are available exclusively on DStv.
BET Africa (Exclusive to DStv)
BET 2 (Replaced BET International on DStv in April 2015 but closed before the end of the year)
BET International (Available to all Digital TV services except DStv)
Comedy Central Africa (Exclusive to DStv)
MTV Base Africa (Formally exclusive to Dstv but now available to other providers.)
MTV Africa (Launched 2013 as MTV South Africa to replace MTV Europe. Exclusive to DStv)
Nickelodeon Europe (on some providers)
Nickelodeon (Exclusive to DStv and GOtv)
Nick Jr. (Exclusive to DStv)
Nicktoons (Exclusive to DStv)
VH1 Europe (Exclusive to DStv until it got discontinued and replaced by VH1 Classic)
VH1 Classic Europe (Exclusive to DStv until March 4, 2019, as the channel got replaced with MTV Music 24)
MTV Music 24 (Launched on DStv in March 2019 replacing VH1 Classic, but closed on 1 June 2021 to be replaced by MTV Hits)
MTV Hits (Exclusive to DStv)

Paramount Global-related lists
Lists of television channels